Bulgarian Brazilians (Portuguese: búlgaro-brasileiros, Bulgarian: бразилци българи, Braziltsi Bŭlgari) are Brazilian citizens who are fully, partially or predominantly of Bulgarian descent or are Bulgarian-born people residing in Brazil.

According to 2011 estimates, there are around 65,000 Bulgarians or people of Bulgarian descent currently living in Brazil.

Notable Bulgarian Brazilians

The most notable Brazilian citizen of Bulgarian origin is Dilma Rousseff, former and first female president of Brazil. Her father, Pétar, was born in Gabrovo and, as a member of the Bulgarian Communist Party in the 1920s, he was forced to flee Bulgaria in 1929 due to political persecution. Rousseff's win during the 2010 presidential election sparked excitement in Bulgaria.

References

European Brazilian
Bulgarian diaspora